Tomasz Lucjan Adamczuk (4 January 1953 – 21 December 1993) was a Polish politician from the Polish People's Party. He was elected as member of the Sejm in its 9th term and as member of the Senate in its third term. He died after the start of term, but formally his mandate expired 3 February 1994.

References

1953 births
1993 deaths
People from Lublin Voivodeship
Polish People's Party politicians
Members of the Polish Sejm 1985–1989
Members of the Senate of Poland 1993–1997
Polish politicians who committed suicide
Suicides by hanging in Poland